Zbigniew Raszewski (5 April 1925, Poznań) was a Polish writer and theatre historian.

Life
Shortly after his birth his family moved to Bydgoszcz, where he spent his childhood and youth. He wrote one of the best books on the town, and more broadly on Polish-German relations there, in the form of Pamiętnik gapia. Bydgoszcz, jaką pamiętam z lat 1930-1945 Wyd. Pomorze Bydgoszcz., a compendium of memoirs.

In 1945 - 1949, he studied Polish at the University of Poznań, later becoming an assistant at the university. He moved to Warsaw and was involved with the Institute of Contemporary Art at the Polish Academy of Sciences, as well as becoming a professor at the Warsaw Theater School in Zelwerowicza.

Works
 Z tradycji teatralnych Pomorza, Wielkopolski i Śląska 1955
 Teatr ogromny 1961
 Staroświecczyzna i postęp czasu 1963
 Raptularz 1965-1967
 Raptularz 1965-1992
 Raptularz 1968-1969
 Słownik biograficzny teatru polskiego 1973
 Krótka historia Teatru Polskiego 1977
 Bilet do teatru: Szkice Bogusławski Teatr w świecie widowisk Trudny rebus: Studia i szkice z historii teatru Weryfikacja czarodzieja i inne szkice o teatrze Listy do Małgorzaty Musierowicz Mój świat Pamiętnik gapia. Bydgoszcz, jaką pamiętam z lat 1930-1945 Teatr na Placu Krasińskich''

1925 births
1992 deaths
Historians of theatre
20th-century Polish historians
Polish male non-fiction writers
Theatre in Poland
20th-century Polish male writers
Recipients of the State Award Badge (Poland)